Jason Daily is a Gaelic footballer who plays for St Loman's and at senior level for the Westmeath county team. He plays as a goalkeeper for both.

Daily made his full championship debut against Dublin in 2020.

He is the goalkeeper who won the 2022 Tailteann Cup.

Honours
Westmeath
 Tailteann Cup (1): 2022

References

Year of birth missing (living people)
Living people
Gaelic football goalkeepers
St Loman's Gaelic footballers
Westmeath inter-county Gaelic footballers